Jussi Pylkkänen (born May 1963) is a Finnish art dealer, and the global president of the auction house Christie's.

Pylkkänen was educated at King's College School in Wimbledon, and has a bachelor's degree in English from Lady Margaret Hall at Oxford University, and a master's degree in Fine and Decorative Art.

Pylkkänen is a governor of the Dulwich Picture Gallery.

References

1963 births
Finnish art dealers
Living people
Finnish businesspeople
Finnish expatriates in England